Stateside Virgin Islands Americans are West Indian Americans who hold US citizenship and who have migrated from the U.S. Virgin Islands to the continental United States and Hawaii, and their descendants.

Persons born in the U.S. Virgin Islands are United States citizens, and as a result do not go through the legal immigration procedures a typical West Indies immigrant would. Virgin Islanders in the U.S. are considered part of the Caribbean American community.

It is difficult to determine how many Virgin Islanders reside in the United States proper.  According to the 2000 U.S. Census, there are 15,014 people of U.S. Virgin Islands ancestry residing in the continental United States and Hawaii. However, a count of American residents with "U.S. Virgin Islands ancestry" excludes most U.S. Virgin Islands-born migrants in the United States proper. Because of a high incidence of inter-Caribbean migration throughout the 1960s and 1970s, most native-born Virgin Islanders today are one or two generations removed from other Caribbean islands and would not necessarily define themselves as having "U.S. Virgin Islands ancestry."  For example, Tim Duncan is a St. Croix native with Anguillian ancestry.

Demographics 
Virgin Island Americans includes Americans with ancestry from both the US Virgin Islands and British Virgin Islands, together numbering about 25,000. A majority of Virgin Islands Americans are of black Afro-Caribbean descent, many of whom descend from enslaved Africans brought to the islands by Europeans in the colonial era. A large portion descends from black or mixed race migrants who came from other parts of the Caribbean including Jamaica, Puerto Rico, Trinidad and Tobago, the Dominican Republic, Haiti, and many smaller countries in the Lesser Antilles.

Many Virgin Islands Americans concentrate in areas with a large overall Caribbean population, including areas like New York, Florida, Georgia, New Jersey, and Connecticut.

Notable people

Actors 
 Wayne Brady (born 1972), actor; born in Georgia
 Lisa Canning (born 1966), television actress; born on St. Thomas
 Kelsey Grammer (born 1955), actor; born on St. Thomas
 Lawrence Hilton-Jacobs (born 1953), actor; born in New York City
 Jasmin St. Claire (born 1972), adult film actress; born in Christiansted, St. Croix
 Karrine Steffans (born 1978), New York Times bestselling author, former hip hop music video performer, actress; born on St. Thomas

Artists 
 Fraser Kershaw, philanthropist, film artist

Athletes
   Christian Lloyd Joseph born 1972, Professional Boxer and former I.B.C Intercontinental Middleweight Champion
 Raja Bell (born 1976), basketball player; born on St. Croix
 Tombi Bell (born 1979), basketball player, who last played for the Minnesota Lynx of the WNBA; born on St. Croix
 Joe Christopher (born 1935), the first Virgin Islander to play in Major League Baseball; born in Frederiksted, St. Croix
 Midre Cummings (born 1971), baseball player; born on St. Croix
 Tim Duncan (born 1976), professional basketball player (San Antonio Spurs); born in Christiansted, St. Croix
 Emile Griffith (1938–2013), boxer; born on St. Thomas
 Elrod Hendricks (1940–2005), Major League Baseball player and coach; born in Charlotte Amalie, St. Thomas
 Julian Jackson (born 1960), boxer; born on St. Thomas
 Calvin Pickering (born 1976), baseball player; born on St. Thomas
 Sugar Ray Seales (born 1952), 1972 Olympic Gold Medalist (139 lbs.) boxer; born on St. Croix.

Musicians 
 Alton Adams (1889–1987), musician, first black bandmaster in the United States Navy; born in Charlotte Amalie, St. Thomas
 Bennie Benjamin (1907–1989), composer, songwriter, philanthropist; born in Christiansted, St. Croix
 Jon Lucien, jazz musician; born on Tortola, raised on St. Thomas
 Rock City, a musical duo of composed brothers Timothy and Theron Thomas, born on St. Thomas
 Sonny Rollins, jazz musician; born in New York, of St. Thomas (mother) and St. Croix (father) descent

Political leaders 
 Judah P. Benjamin (1811–1884), Secretary of the Treasury, Confederate States of America; born in Christiansted, St. Croix
 Frank Rudolph Crosswaith (1892–1965), socialist and labor leader; born in Frederiksted, St. Croix
 Alexander Hamilton (1755–1804), first United States Secretary of the Treasury, an American "Founding Father", economist, and political philosopher; born in Nevis, raised on St. Croix
 Hubert Henry Harrison (1883–1927), orator, political activist; born in St. Croix
 Elizabeth Anna Hendrickson (1884–1946), civil rights leader; born in St. Croix
 Casper Holstein (born 1888), humanitarian; born in St. Croix
 Roy Innis (born 1934), African-American activist, civil rights leader; born in St. Croix
 J. Raymond Jones (1899–1991), political leader, humanitarian; born in St. Thomas
 John de Jongh (born 1957), past governor of the U.S. Virgin Islands, former financial executive; born in St. Thomas
 William Leidesdorff (1810–1848), entrepreneur; born in St. Croix
 Ruby Margaret Rouss (1921–1988) first black woman to be elected to preside over a state legislature; born in St. Croix
 Terence Todman (born 1926), ambassador; born in the U.S. Virgin Islands
 Denmark Vesey (1767–1822), slave revolt leader; born on St. Thomas
 David Levy Yulee (1810–1886), U.S. Senator; born on St. Thomas

Writers and intellectuals 
 Barbara Christian (1943–2000), educator, feminist critic; born on St. Thomas

News Media Personalities 
 Candace Owens (born 1989), Conservative News Commentator, Turning Point USA co-founder, YouTube personality; grandmother from St. Thomas

See also
 West Indian Americans
 Stateside Puerto Ricans

References

Caribbean American
Main
Main